The 1972–73 OB I bajnokság season was the 36th season of the OB I bajnokság, the top level of ice hockey in Hungary. Five teams participated in the league, and Ferencvarosi TC won the championship.

Regular season

External links
 Season on hockeyarchives.info

Hun
OB I bajnoksag seasons
1972–73 in Hungarian ice hockey